Le Robert is a town and the third-largest commune in the French overseas department of Martinique. It is located in the northeastern (Atlantic) side of the island of Martinique. It contains the Sainte Rose-de-Lima church, Club Nautique Wind Force club, Stade Municipal du Robert and a sportsground. The village of Hyacinthe lies in the commune.

Population

Notable people
Édouard de Lépine (1932- 2020), historian and politician
Ronny Turiaf, NBA basketball player for the Los Angeles Clippers

See also
Communes of the Martinique department

References

External links

Communes of Martinique
Populated places in Martinique